Samuel of Waldebba (Ge'ez ሳሙኤል ዘሀገረ ወልድባ) was a late fourteenth- and early fifteenth-century Ethiopian saint of the Ethiopian Orthodox Church. He is considered the founder of Waldebba Monastery in northern Ethiopia and is one of Ethiopia's most prominent saints.

Life
The Gadle Samuel hagiography, written in the fifteenth century and with both long and short versions, states that he was born in Aksum and had a brother. His mother left her husband to become a nun and Samuel followed her example by refusing to marry. He went to the monastery called Däbrä Bänkʷal, where he became a monk. After his father died, he became a coenobitic monk, living alone in the wilderness among the wild beasts. He tamed lions and performed many miracles. He walked through water without his book getting wet and Saint Michael flew him through the air to visit Jerusalem. He was an extreme ascetic; for instance, standing in a pit praying for months, wearing sackcloth, and not eating for forty days. He is said to have died at the age of 100.

Stories about Samuel also appear in the Ethiopian Miracles of Mary.

Illuminations 
The saint is a popular subject of painting. as shown by this image of him riding a lion in the British Library Oriental manuscript 590.

References

Nosnitsin, Denis. "Samuˀel of Waldəbba ". In Encyclopaedia Aethiopica: O-X: Vol. 4, edited by Siegbert Uhlig, 516–18. Wiesbaden: Harrassowitz, 2010.

Borissus Turaiev, Vita Samuelis Valdebani, Petropoli 1902 (Monumenta AethiopiaeHagiologica 2).

Osvaldo Raineri, “Samuele di Waldebba”, in J. N. Cañellas – S. Virgulin – G. Guaita (eds.), Biblioteca sanctorum orientalium. Enciclopedia dei Santi. Le Chiese Orientali, Roma 1998ff. vol. 2, 934ff.

External links
 Short exposé on the Waldebba monastery and Samuel of Waldebba (youtube)

15th-century Ethiopian people
Ethiopian saints
15th-century Christian saints